The Formiche di Grosseto ("Ants of Grosseto") is a group of islets which emerge sharply in the Tuscan Archipelago.

Description
The Formiche di Grosseto are three islets named, according to their dimensions, Formichino, Formica Media and Formica Grande which develop a total surface of about 120,000 square metres which extend lined up from north-west to south-east over one mile. Formichino is the smallest and is formed by two skerries, is the southernmost and has an area of only 20 square metres. Formica Media is a long narrow strip of rock that continues under water situated on a shoal. Formica Grande is the largest, has a rhomboidal shape, it is 370 metres long and 230 metres wide, is the northernmost and home the Scoglio Formiche di Grosseto lighthouse. The island has three old docking points on three different sides to permit the mooring depending on the wind and is equipped with a helipad utilized for the maintenance of the lighthouse.

Flora and fauna
The Formiche di Grosseto is a place enjoyed by scuba divers for the richness of its waters. The seabed is prosperous in sponges, gorgoniidae, sabella spallanzanii and in fishes as grouper, sarago, conger, muraena, astice and lobster.

See also
 List of islands of Italy
 Scoglio Formiche di Grosseto Lighthouse

Gallery

References

Islands of Tuscany
Province of Grosseto